Juliana Ragghianti Lohmann Cardoso (born September 1, 1989, in Niterói, Rio de Janeiro) is a Brazilian actress.

Biography 
Juliana was discovered in 1998 while watching the World Cup games through a screen on the beach in Icaraí in Niterói. A headhunter invited her to a test model. Three years later she joined Globo as an actress on the show Malhação. Her character was Gabriela Ferreira, Girl Genius and the youngest of the family, remained in the teen series until 2002.

In 2002 participated in the soap opera O Beijo do Vampiro as Pandora, which formed a triangle with the characters of Kayky Brito and Cecília Dassi.

In 2004 after participating in a series Um Só Coração, Juliana returned to soap operas such as Teca, of Começar de Novo, once again playing the girlfriend of the character Kayky Brito. You could say that Juliana consolidated her acting career in this soap opera, because it had an important character from beginning to end of story.

In 2006, after appearances on programs from the Globo, he left home to join the TV Record telenovela through Vidas Opostas in the role of Carla Rocha, daughter played by Luciano Szafir and Babi Xavier.

In 2007 Juliana paraded at Fashion Rio also took part in the new season of Mandrake Channel HBO, playing the character Alice. For a minor to perform recording, Lohmann needed a special permit from the Juvenile Court and a guarantee of a psychologist, because the paper was a teenage prostitute. In the same year, the actress made a test Paparazzo sensual to the site, after completing 18 years, the pictures were inspired by the book Lolita, by Vladimir Nabokov.

In December 2009 Juliana and two friends and colleagues (Lara Gay and Michelly Barros), launched a book called Ela a Outra e Eu, consisting of poems which were united in one book in which the protagonists seem one; three distinct personalities joined by passions. The theater, literature, for life. The book expressing this sensitive unit cemented by the poetry was released by the publisher iVentura.

Filmography

Television

Film

Theater

References

External links 
Official Website

1989 births
Living people
People from Niterói
Brazilian television actresses
Brazilian telenovela actresses
Brazilian film actresses
Brazilian stage actresses